Richard Hamilton (January 23, 1836 – July 6, 1881), a Union Navy Coal Heaver, received the Medal of Honor for bravery for his participation in the sinking of the CSS Albemarle during the American Civil War.

Military service
Hamilton, a native of Philadelphia, Pennsylvania, served in the Union Navy from 1862 to 1865. He was taken prisoner after the action on the Roanoke River for which he would later be honored.

An article appeared in the July 4, 1879 Philadelphia Times newspaper about Hamilton. It read:

Richard Hamilton lives at 260 Liberty street, Camden. He declares that he was one of the number who, with Cushing, aided in blowing up the Rebel ram Albemarle, at Plymouth, N. C., October 27, 1864. When he enlisted he was a resident of this city. He is now unable to work and his family are in destitute circumstances. "Cushing and the officers got all the prize money," remarked Hamilton the other day, "while us privates received nothing. Had I my share, over two thousand dollars, I need not live as I live now. Twelve of us have not received a cent from the government, although the matter has been brought before the courts and Congress." Hamilton was honorably discharged and was awarded the medal of honor, March 12, 1865, for gallant and meritorious conduct while serving in the picket boat which destroyed the Rebel ram Albemarle. The inscription on the medal reads: "Personal valor - Richard Hamilton, Coal Heaver, Picket Boat No. 1 - Destruction of the Albemarle, October 27, 1864.

Medal of Honor citation
Rank and organization: Coal Heaver, U.S. Navy. Accredited to: Pennsylvania G.O. No.: 45, December 31, 1864.
 

Hamilton's official Medal of Honor citation reads:

Hamilton served on board the U.S. Picket Boat No. 1, in action, 27 October 1864, against the Confederate ram Albemarle which had resisted repeated attacks by our steamers and had kept a large force of vessels employed in watching her. The picket boat, equipped with a spar torpedo, succeeded in passing the enemy pickets within 20 yards without being discovered and then made for the Albemarle under a full head of steam. Immediately taken under fire by the ram, the small boat plunged on, jumped the log boom which encircled the target and exploded its torpedo under the port bow of the ram. The picket boat was destroyed by enemy fire and almost the entire crew taken prisoner or lost.

Death and burial

Medal of Honor recipient Richard Hamilton survived the war and died in Camden, New Jersey on July 6, 1881 due to paralysis complicated by syphilis. He was buried July 10, 1881 in Evergreen Cemetery, Camden, New Jersey. Although a record of his interment has yet to be found in the Evergreen Cemetery burial register at the Camden County Historical Society, both Hamilton's death certificate and obituary indicate that he was buried in Evergreen Cemetery, most likely in the William B. Hatch Post, No. 37, G. A. R. Soldiers plot.

Hamilton's death notice in the July 8, 1881 Philadelphia Record newspaper read:

HAMILTON - On the 6th inst., RICHARD, son of the late George and Emma Hamilton, aged 45 years. The relatives and friends of the family; also T. M. K. Lee Post, No. 5; William B. Hatch Post, No. 37, G. A. R. and Gospel Temperance Union, No. 1, of Camden, N. J., are respectfully invited to attend the funeral, on Sunday, 10th inst., at 2 o'clock, from his late residence, No. 260 Liberty street, Camden, N. J. To proceed to Evergreen Cemetery.

Hamilton's funeral article in the July 11, 1881 Philadelphia Inquirer newspaper read:

Large Funeral - Yesterday Richard Hamilton, a soldier in the last war, was buried with the usual honors from his late residence in Camden. Deceased was one of the survivors of the Albemarle, which was sunk by the rebels at Plymouth, North Carolina, October 24, 1864. He was rescued from drowning, and afterwards sent to the jail at Salisbury as a prisoner of war. The services were performed by Isaac S. Peacock of the Reformed Men's Home, of which deceased was a member, and the sermon was preached by Rev. Mr. Saulcup.

See also
List of American Civil War Medal of Honor recipients: G–L
CSS Albemarle

Notes

References 

 

 

 

1836 births
1881 deaths
United States Navy Medal of Honor recipients
Union Navy sailors
Military personnel from Philadelphia
American Civil War recipients of the Medal of Honor
American Civil War prisoners of war